Manuel Rondo Roku (born 25 May 1967) is an Equatoguinean long-distance runner. He competed in the men's 5000 metres at the 1988 Summer Olympics.

References

1967 births
Living people
Athletes (track and field) at the 1988 Summer Olympics
Equatoguinean male long-distance runners
Olympic athletes of Equatorial Guinea
Place of birth missing (living people)